Turøyna or Turøy is an island in Øygarden Municipality in Vestland county, Norway. The  island lies just west of the islands of Toftøyna and Misje. Prior to 1964, the island was part of the old municipality of Herdla. Then from 1964 until 2020 it was part of Fjell municipality.

About one hundred people live on the island. The island has a road connection to the mainland via the Turøy Bridge which connects to Toftøyna. The road then continues over a series of bridges connecting a string of islands to each other and to the city of Bergen. The postcode is 5365 Turøy.
 
The island is a good spot for birdwatching and there is an ornithological station on the island.

The island received some notoriety because of a 2016 helicopter crash.

See also
List of islands of Norway

References

Islands of Vestland
Øygarden
Bird observatories
Birdwatching sites in Norway